Ann Cusack (born May 22, 1961) is an American actress. She had minor roles in Multiplicity (1996), A League of Their Own (1992), and The Informant! (2009). Additionally, she has made guest appearances in a number of television series, including Grey's Anatomy, Scandal, One Tree Hill, Charmed, Ghost Whisperer, The Unit, Boston Legal, Bones, Frasier, Ally McBeal, Criminal Minds, Private Practice, Fargo, Better Call Saul, The Boys and The Good Doctor.

Early life
Cusack was born in New York City and was raised in Evanston, Illinois. She is the sister of actors Joan, John, Bill, and Susie. Her mother, Ann Paula "Nancy" (née Carolan; 1929-2022), was a mathematics teacher and political activist. Her father, Dick Cusack, was an actor, producer, and writer. With her sister Joan and brother John, she trained at the Piven Theatre Workshop in Evanston and the Berklee College of Music in Boston, Massachusetts.

Career
Cusack starred in her first film role in 1992, when she was cast in A League of Their Own, as Shirley Baker. She was in the 1996 comedy Multiplicity, which starred Michael Keaton and Andie MacDowell. Also in 1996, she replaced Anita Barone on The Jeff Foxworthy Show until the series ended. In 1998, Cusack starred in Maggie on Lifetime Television. 

Cusack has made guest appearances in Grey's Anatomy, Scandal, One Tree Hill, Charmed, Ghost Whisperer, The Unit, Boston Legal, Bones, Frasier, Ally McBeal, Criminal Minds, Private Practice, and Castle among others. In 2002, she guest-starred in the episode of Star Trek: Enterprise entitled "Carbon Creek". She had a small role in Grosse Pointe Blank, which starred her siblings John and Joan; appeared in the movie Accepted, in which she plays Diane Gaines, mother to the lead character played by Justin Long; and appeared in the film What Planet Are You From?. She also co-starred in Ace Ventura Jr: Pet Detective as Melissa Robinson Ventura, the titular character's mother (replacing Courteney Cox from the original film). 

She also appeared in the SciFi series Lost Room as Helen Ruber (two episodes, 2006). In 2015, she appeared in the first episode of Fargo'''s second season. In 2016, she played Donna Dent in the Clint Eastwood-directed Warner Bros. film Sully, about Chesley Sullenberger and the events of Flight 1549, starring Tom Hanks. She also made her first appearance as Rebecca Bois, Chuck's ex wife, in season two of Better Call Saul'', later returning in season three.

Filmography

Film

Television

References

External links
 
 

20th-century American actresses
21st-century American actresses
Actresses from Chicago
Actresses from Evanston, Illinois
Actresses from New York City
American film actresses
American people of Irish descent
American television actresses
Berklee College of Music alumni
Cusack family (United States)
Living people
People from Manhattan
1961 births